Shinde (pronunciation: [ʃin̪d̪e]) is a clan of the Maratha clan system variations of the name include Scindia and Sindhia, Sindia.

The Scindia dynasty was founded by Ranoji Scindia, a Kunbi personal servant who started as a "slipper-bearer" of Bajirao I Peshwa. He was the son of Jankojirao Scindia, the hereditary Kunbi Patils of Kanherkhed, a village in Satara District, Maharashtra.

Other people with this name 

Adarsh Shinde, singer
Eknath Shinde, politician
Gauri Shinde, film director
Jyotiraditya Scindia, Indian politician
Mahadaji Shinde, Maratha statesmen
Praniti Shinde, politician
Ram Shinde, politician
Ranoji Scindia, Maratha statesmen
Sadashiv Shinde, Indian cricketer
Sayaji Shinde, Indian actor
Shashikant Shinde, politician
Shilpa Shinde, TV actress
Seema Shinde, TV actress
Shrikant Shinde, politician
Sushilkumar Shinde, politician
Tarabai Shinde, Indian feminist
Vasundhara Raje Scindia, Indian politician

References 

Indian surnames
Marathi-language surnames
Maratha clans